Laurent Courtois (born 11 September 1978) is a French former professional footballer who is currently the head coach of Columbus Crew 2, the MLS Next Pro reserve team of Major League Soccer's Columbus Crew.

Club career
Laurent Courtois began his career in the youth ranks of top French club Olympique Lyonnais. In the 1998–99 season he moved to AC Ajaccio in Ligue 2, where he gained his first experience. After a fine season with Ajaccio he transferred to Toulouse,
where he helped the club gain promotion to Ligue 1. After a successful second season with Toulouse he was transferred to West Ham United in England. After 18 unsuccessful months with only seven Premier League appearances, Courtois left England and returned home.

He signed with FC Istres in January 2003 to restart his career. In two years at the club, he appeared in 74 league matches and scored 9 goals. In 2005, he joined Spanish La Liga side Levante. He remained at the club for three years. In 2008, he returned to France joining Grenoble. He helped the club gain promotion to Ligue 1 during the  2008–09 season.

During the second half of the 2011 Major League Soccer season, Courtois signed with Chivas USA. He was released on 30 June 2013, just a day after scoring a goal against the New England Revolution in a 1–1 draw.

After a brief trial, Courtois signed with Chivas USA's city rivals Los Angeles Galaxy on 19 July 2013.

Courtois made his debut with the Los Angeles Galaxy on 20 July 2013 against Vancouver Whitecaps FC.

After signing for the Galaxy's reserve squad as a player/coach, he announced his retirement on 15 August 2014 in order to obtain his coaching credentials from the FFF.

Coaching career
Following his retirement, Courtois returned to France to work with the Olympique Lyonnais Reserves and Academy that he had developed in. He went back to the United States in 2019 to join the Academy system of Major League Soccer club Columbus Crew SC. On 28 January 2022, Courtois was named inaugural head coach of Columbus Crew 2 ahead of the first MLS Next Pro season.

Personal life
Laurent Courtois holds a blue belt in brazilian jiu-jitsu under André Alemão Vasconcellos.

References

External links

1978 births
Living people
Footballers from Lyon
Association football midfielders
French footballers
French expatriate footballers
French expatriate sportspeople in the United States
Footballers from Réunion
Olympique Lyonnais players
Grenoble Foot 38 players
AC Ajaccio players
Toulouse FC players
West Ham United F.C. players
FC Istres players
Chivas USA players
LA Galaxy players
LA Galaxy II players
La Liga players
Levante UD footballers
Premier League players
Ligue 1 players
Ligue 2 players
Major League Soccer players
Expatriate footballers in Spain
Expatriate footballers in England
Expatriate soccer players in the United States
USL Championship players
Player-coaches
French expatriate football managers
Expatriate soccer managers in the United States
Columbus Crew non-playing staff